The Deep Purple may refer to:
 The Deep Purple (1915 film), a 1915 film directed by James Young
 The Deep Purple (1920 film), a 1920 film directed by Raoul Walsh

See also
 Deep Purple (disambiguation)